"Til a Tear Becomes a Rose" is a song originally recorded by American country music artist Leon Everette. It was released in 1985 from his album Where's the Fire. His version of the song peaked at number 44 on Hot Country Songs.

The song was later covered by Keith Whitley as a duet with his wife Lorrie Morgan. Posthumously released in July 1990, it was the only single from his Greatest Hits album. This version peaked at number 13 on the country singles charts and won the Vocal Event of the Year at the Country Music Association awards.

Another version was released in 1990 by Jann Browne on her album Tell Me Why.

John Prine and Fiona Whelan Prine also covered the song for the 1999 album In Spite of Ourselves.

In 2015, a version of the song was released by singer Kevin Moon and Bluegrass artist Rhonda Vincent for Moon's Throwback CD.

Chart performance

Leon Everette

Keith Whitley with Lorrie Morgan

References

1985 singles
1990 singles
Leon Everette songs
Jann Browne songs
Keith Whitley songs
Lorrie Morgan songs
Songs written by Bill Rice
Songs written by Sharon Vaughn
Male–female vocal duets
Song recordings produced by Garth Fundis
RCA Records singles
Mercury Records singles
Songs released posthumously
1985 songs